Pseudomonas mosselii is a Gram-negative, rod-shaped, bacterium clinically isolated in France. Based on 16S rRNA analysis, P. mosselii has been placed in the P. putida group.

References

External links
Type strain of Pseudomonas mosselii at BacDive -  the Bacterial Diversity Metadatabase

Pseudomonadales
Bacteria described in 2002